The World Figure Skating Championships is an annual figure skating competition sanctioned by the International Skating Union in which figure skaters compete for the title of World Champion.

Men's and pairs' competitions took place from February 14 to 15 in Vienna, Austria. Ladies' competitions took place from January 31 to February 1 in Davos, Switzerland.

Results

Men

Judges:
 Max Bohatsch 
 Josef Fellner 
 Ernst Herz 
 Andor Szende 
 László Szollás

Ladies

Judges:
 Fritz Kachler 
 Josef Fellner 
 Fritz Hellmund 
 G. Künzli 
 Andor Szende

Pairs

Judges:
 Ernst Herz 
 Andor Szende 
 Otto Bohatsch 
 László Szollás 
 Eugen Minich

Sources
 Result List provided by the ISU

World Figure Skating Championships
World Figure Skating Championships
World Figure Skating Championships
World Figure Skating Championships
International figure skating competitions hosted by Austria
International figure skating competitions hosted by Switzerland
Sport in Davos
1920s in Vienna
February 1925 sports events
1925 in Swiss sport
1925 in Austrian sport
January 1925 sports events
Sports competitions in Vienna